During the 1995–96 season Atalanta Bergamasca Calcio competed in Serie A and Coppa Italia.

Summary 
The club sold Argentine midfielder Leo Rodriguez to Universidad de Chile and young star striker Maurizio Ganz to Internazionale, meanwhile bought Sandro Tovalieri from Bari and Christian Vieri from Torino to balance the offensive line. Also central back José Oscar Herrera arrived from Cagliari Calcio and 20-yrs-old Midfielder Tomas Locatelli transferred out to Milan A.C.

The squad took in the 3rd spot on December with 4 wins row, after that, 6 lost matches shattered the club to the low League table spots. The squad avoided relegation in the final rounds. In the campaign both Christian Vieri and Domenico Morfeo played in a well form scoring 22 goals.

In Coppa Italia, the squad reached the Final after 9 years and lost against Fiorentina. Previously, Atalanta defeated Cremonese, Juventus (goal of Fabio Gallo ), Cagliari and Bologna.

Squad 

(vice-Captain)

(Captain)

Transfers

Autumn

Competitions

Serie A

League table

Results by round

Matches 

-

Coppa Italia

Eightfinals

Quarterfinals

Semifinals

Final

First leg

Second leg

Statistics

Squad statistics

Player statistics

References

Bibliography

External links 
 

Atalanta B.C. seasons
Atalanta